Popeil is a surname. Notable people with the surname include:

 Lisa Popeil (born 1956), American voice coach, singer, and musician
 Ron Popeil (1935–2021), American inventor and marketer

See also
 Popel
 Popiel (disambiguation)